Sapindales  is an order of flowering plants. The APG III system of 2009 includes it in the clade malvids (in rosids, in eudicots) with nine families: The anthophytes are a grouping of plant taxa bearing flower-like reproductive structures. They were formerly thought to be a clade comprising plants bearing flower-like structures.  The group contained the angiosperms - the extant flowering plants, such as roses and grasses - as well as the Gnetales and the extinct Bennettitales.

23,420 species of vascular plant have been recorded in South Africa, making it the sixth most species-rich country in the world and the most species-rich country on the African continent. Of these, 153 species are considered to be threatened. Nine biomes have been described in South Africa: Fynbos, Succulent Karoo, desert, Nama Karoo, grassland, savanna, Albany thickets, the Indian Ocean coastal belt, and forests.

The 2018 South African National Biodiversity Institute's National Biodiversity Assessment plant checklist lists 35,130 taxa in the phyla Anthocerotophyta (hornworts (6)), Anthophyta (flowering plants (33534)), Bryophyta (mosses (685)), Cycadophyta (cycads (42)), Lycopodiophyta (Lycophytes(45)), Marchantiophyta (liverworts (376)), Pinophyta (conifers (33)), and Pteridophyta (cryptogams (408)).

Eight families are represented in the literature. Listed taxa include species, subspecies, varieties, and forms as recorded, some of which have subsequently been allocated to other taxa as synonyms, in which cases the accepted taxon is appended to the listing. Multiple entries under alternative names reflect taxonomic revision over time.

Anacardiaceae
 Family: Anacardiaceae,

Anacardium
Genus Anacardium:
 Anacardium occidentale L. not indigenous, naturalised

Harpephyllum
Genus Harpephyllum:
 Harpephyllum caffrum Bernh. ex Krauss, indigenous

Heeria
Genus Heeria:
 Heeria argentea (Thunb.) Meisn. endemic
 Heeria insignis (Delile) Kuntze, accepted as Ozoroa insignis Delile subsp. reticulata (Baker f.) J.B.Gillett, endemic
 Heeria paniculosa (Sond.) Kuntze, accepted as Ozoroa paniculosa (Sond.) R.Fern. & A.Fern. var. paniculosa, indigenous

Lannea
Genus Lannea:
 Lannea discolor (Sond.) Engl. indigenous
 Lannea edulis (Sond.) Engl. indigenous
 Lannea edulis (Sond.) Engl. var. edulis, indigenous
 Lannea gossweileri Exell & MendonÃ§a, indigenous
 Lannea gossweileri Exell & MendonÃ§a subsp. tomentella (R.Fern. & A.Fern.) J.B.Gillett, indigenous
 Lannea schweinfurthii (Engl.) Engl. indigenous
 Lannea schweinfurthii (Engl.) Engl. var. stuhlmannii (Engl.) Kokwaro, indigenous

Laurophyllus
Genus Laurophyllus:
 Laurophyllus capensis Thunb. endemic

Loxostylis
Genus Loxostylis:
 Loxostylis alata A.Spreng. ex Rchb. endemic

Mangifera
Genus Mangifera:
 Mangifera indica L. not indigenous, naturalised

Ozoroa
Genus Ozoroa:
 Ozoroa albicans R.Fern. & A.Fern. endemic
 Ozoroa barbertonensis Retief, endemic
 Ozoroa concolor (C.Presl ex Sond.) De Winter, indigenous
 Ozoroa crassinervia (Engl.) R.Fern. & A.Fern. indigenous
 Ozoroa dispar (C.Presl) R.Fern. & A.Fern. indigenous
 Ozoroa engleri R.Fern. & A.Fern. indigenous
 Ozoroa mucronata (Bernh.) R.Fern. & A.Fern. endemic
 Ozoroa namaensis (Schinz & Dinter) R.Fern. indigenous
 Ozoroa namaquensis (Sprague) Von Teichman & A.E.van Wyk, indigenous
 Ozoroa obovata (Oliv.) R.Fern. & A.Fern. indigenous
 Ozoroa obovata (Oliv.) R.Fern. & A.Fern. var. elliptica R.Fern. & A.Fern. indigenous
 Ozoroa obovata (Oliv.) R.Fern. & A.Fern. var. obovata, indigenous
 Ozoroa paniculosa (Sond.) R.Fern. & A.Fern. indigenous
 Ozoroa paniculosa (Sond.) R.Fern. & A.Fern. var. paniculosa, indigenous
 Ozoroa paniculosa (Sond.) R.Fern. & A.Fern. var. salicina (Sond.) R.Fern. & A.Fern. indigenous
 Ozoroa sphaerocarpa R.Fern. & A.Fern. indigenous

Protorhus
Genus Protorhus:
 Protorhus longifolia (Bernh.) Engl. indigenous
 Protorhus namaquensis Sprague, accepted as Ozoroa namaquensis (Sprague) Von Teichman & A.E.van Wyk

Rhus
Genus Rhus:
 Rhus acocksii Moffett, accepted as Searsia acocksii (Moffett) Moffett, endemic
 Rhus albomarginata Sond. accepted as Searsia albomarginata (Sond.) Moffett, endemic
 Rhus angustifolia L. accepted as Searsia angustifolia (L.) F.A.Barkley, endemic
 Rhus batophylla Codd, accepted as Searsia batophylla (Codd) Moffett, endemic
 Rhus bolusii Sond. ex Engl. accepted as Searsia bolusii (Sond. ex Engl.) Moffett, indigenous
 Rhus burchellii Sond. ex Engl. accepted as Searsia burchellii (Sond. ex Engl.) Moffett, indigenous
 Rhus carnosula Schonland, accepted as Searsia carnosula (Schonland) Moffett, endemic
 Rhus chirindensis Baker f. accepted as Searsia chirindensis (Baker f.) Moffett, indigenous
 Rhus ciliata Licht. ex Schult. accepted as Searsia ciliata (Licht. ex Schult.) A.J.Mill. indigenous
 Rhus coriacea Engl. accepted as Searsia magalismontana (Sond.) Moffett subsp. magalismontana, present
 Rhus crenata Thunb. accepted as Searsia crenata (Thunb.) Moffett, endemic
 Rhus cuneifolia L.f. accepted as Searsia cuneifolia (L.f.) F.A.Barkley, endemic
 Rhus dentata Thunb. accepted as Searsia dentata (Thunb.) F.A.Barkley, present
 Rhus discolor E.Mey. ex Sond. accepted as Searsia discolor (E.Mey. ex Sond.) Moffett, indigenous
 Rhus dissecta Thunb. accepted as Searsia dissecta (Thunb.) Moffett, endemic
 Rhus divaricata Eckl. & Zeyh. accepted as Searsia divaricata (Eckl. & Zeyh.) Moffett, indigenous
 Rhus dracomontana Moffett, accepted as Searsia dracomontana (Moffett) Moffett, endemic
 Rhus dregeana Sond. accepted as Searsia dregeana (Sond.) Moffett, indigenous
 Rhus engleri Britten, accepted as Searsia engleri (Britten) Moffett, endemic
 Rhus erosa Thunb. accepted as Searsia erosa (Thunb.) Moffett, present
 Rhus fastigata Eckl. & Zeyh. accepted as Searsia fastigata (Eckl. & Zeyh.) Moffett, endemic
 Rhus galpinii Schinz, accepted as Searsia grandidens (Harv. ex Engl.) Moffett, present
 Rhus gerrardii (Harv. ex Engl.) Diels, accepted as Searsia gerrardii (Harv. ex Engl.) Moffett, indigenous
 Rhus glabra L. not indigenous, naturalised, invasive
 Rhus glauca Thunb. accepted as Searsia glauca (Thunb.) Moffett, endemic
 Rhus glaucovirens Engl. accepted as Searsia zeyheri (Sond.) Moffett, present
 Rhus gracillima Engl. accepted as Searsia gracillima (Engl.) Moffett, endemic
 Rhus gracillima Engl. var. glaberrima Schonland, accepted as Searsia gracillima (Engl.) Moffett var. glaberrima (Schonland) Moffett, endemic
 Rhus grandidens Harv. ex Engl. accepted as Searsia grandidens (Harv. ex Engl.) Moffett, indigenous
 Rhus grandifolia Engl. accepted as Searsia discolor (E.Mey. ex Sond.) Moffett, present
 Rhus gueinzii Sond. accepted as Searsia gueinzii (Sond.) F.A.Barkley, indigenous
 Rhus harveyi Moffett, accepted as Searsia harveyi (Moffett) Moffett, indigenous
 Rhus horrida Eckl. & Zeyh. accepted as Searsia horrida (Eckl. & Zeyh.) Moffett, endemic
 Rhus incisa L.f. accepted as Searsia incisa (L.f.) F.A.Barkley, indigenous
 Rhus incisa L.f. var. effusa (C.Presl) R.Fern. accepted as Searsia incisa (L.f.) F.A.Barkley var. effusa (C.Presl) Moffett, endemic
 Rhus keetii Schonland, accepted as Searsia keetii (Schonland) Moffett, endemic
 Rhus kirkii Oliv. accepted as Searsia kirkii (Oliv.) Moffett 
 Rhus krebsiana C.Presl ex Engl. accepted as Searsia krebsiana (C.Presl ex Engl.) Moffett, indigenous
 Rhus kwazuluana Moffett, accepted as Searsia kwazuluana (Moffett) Moffett, endemic
 Rhus laevigata L. accepted as Searsia laevigata (L.) F.A.Barkley, endemic
 Rhus laevigata L. var. laevigata forma cangoana, accepted as Searsia laevigata (L.) F.A.Barkley var. laevigata forma congoana, endemic
 Rhus laevigata L. var. laevigata forma laevigata, accepted as Searsia laevigata (L.) F.A.Barkley var. laevigata forma laevigata, endemic
 Rhus laevigata L. var. villosa (L.f.) R.Fern. accepted as Searsia laevigata (L.) F.A.Barkley var. villosa (L.f.) Moffett, present
 Rhus lancea L.f. accepted as Searsia lancea (L.f.) F.A.Barkley, indigenous
 Rhus leptodictya Diels, accepted as Searsia leptodictya (Diels) T.S.Yi, A.J.Mill. & J.Wen forma leptodictya, indigenous
 Rhus longispina Eckl. & Zeyh. accepted as Searsia longispina (Eckl. & Zeyh.) Moffett, endemic
 Rhus lucens Hutch. accepted as Searsia lucens (Hutch.) Moffett 
 Rhus lucida L. accepted as Searsia lucida (L.) F.A.Barkley, indigenous
 Rhus lucida L. forma elliptica (Sond.) Moffett, accepted as Searsia lucida (L.) F.A.Barkley forma elliptica (Sond.) Moffett, endemic
 Rhus lucida L. forma scoparia (Eckl. & Zeyh.) Moffett, accepted as Searsia lucida (L.) F.A.Barkley forma scoparia (Eckl. & Zeyh.) Moffett, endemic
 Rhus magalismontana Sond. accepted as Searsia magalismontana (Sond.) Moffett, indigenous
 Rhus magalismontana Sond. subsp. coddii R.Fern. & (A.Fern.) Moffett, accepted as Searsia magalismontana (Sond.) Moffett subsp. coddii (R.Fern. & A.Fern.) Moffett, endemic
 Rhus magalismontana Sond. subsp. trifoliolata (Baker f.) Moffett, accepted as Searsia magalismontana (Sond.) Moffett subsp. trifoliolata (Baker f.) Moffett, indigenous
 Rhus margaretae Schonland, accepted as Searsia rigida (Mill.) F.A.Barkley var. rigida, indigenous
 Rhus maricoana Moffett, accepted as Searsia maricoana (Moffett) Moffett, endemic
 Rhus marlothii Engl. accepted as Searsia marlothii (Engl.) Moffett 
 Rhus milleri R.Fern. & A.Fern. accepted as Searsia hybrid 
 Rhus montana Diels, accepted as Searsia montana (Diels) Moffett, indigenous
 Rhus natalensis Bernh. ex C.Krauss, accepted as Searsia natalensis (Bernh. ex C.Krauss) F.A.Barkley, indigenous
 Rhus nebulosa Schonland, accepted as Searsia nebulosa (Schonland) Moffett, indigenous
 Rhus nebulosa Schonland forma pubescens Moffett, accepted as Searsia nebulosa (Schonland) Moffett forma pubescens (Moffett) Moffett, endemic
 Rhus pallens Eckl. & Zeyh. accepted as Searsia pallens (Eckl. & Zeyh.) Moffett, indigenous
 Rhus pendulina Jacq. accepted as Searsia pendulina (Jacq.) Moffett, indigenous
 Rhus pentheri Zahlbr. accepted as Searsia pentheri (Zahlbr.) Moffett, indigenous
 Rhus pondoensis Schonland, accepted as Searsia pondoensis (Schonland) Moffett, endemic
 Rhus populifolia E.Mey. ex Sond. accepted as Searsia populifolia (E.Mey. ex Sond.) Moffett, indigenous
 Rhus problematodes Merxm. & Roessler, accepted as Searsia problematodes (Merxm. & Roessler) Moffett 
 Rhus pterota C.Presl, accepted as Searsia pterota (C.Presl) Moffett, endemic
 Rhus puberula Eckl. & Zeyh. accepted as Searsia pyroides (Burch.) Moffett var. pyroides, present
 Rhus pygmaea Moffett, accepted as Searsia pygmaea (Moffett) Moffett, endemic
 Rhus pyroides Burch. var. dinteri (Engl.) Moffett, accepted as Searsia pyroides (Burch.) Moffett var. dinteri (Engl.) Moffett 
 Rhus pyroides Burch. var. gracilis (Engl.) Burtt Davy, accepted as Searsia pyroides (Burch.) Moffett var. gracilis (Engl.) Moffett, indigenous
 Rhus pyroides Burch. var. integrifolia (Engl.) Moffett, accepted as Searsia pyroides (Burch.) Moffett var. integrifolia (Engl.) Moffett, indigenous
 Rhus pyroides Burch. var. puberula (Eckl. & Zeyh.) Schonland, accepted as Searsia pyroides (Burch.) Moffett var. pyroides, present
 Rhus quartiniana A.Rich. accepted as Searsia quartiniana (A.Rich.) A.J.Mill. 
 Rhus refracta Eckl. & Zeyh. accepted as Searsia refracta (Eckl. & Zeyh.) Moffett, endemic
 Rhus rehmanniana Engl. accepted as Searsia rehmanniana (Engl.) Moffett, indigenous
 Rhus rehmanniana Engl. var. glabrata (Sond.) Moffett, accepted as Searsia rehmanniana (Engl.) Moffett var. glabrata (Sond.) Moffett, indigenous
 Rhus rigida Mill. accepted as Searsia rigida (Mill.) F.A.Barkley, indigenous
 Rhus rigida Mill. var. dentata (Engl.) Moffett, accepted as Searsia rigida (Mill.) F.A.Barkley var. dentata (Engl.) Moffett, indigenous
 Rhus rigida Mill. var. margaretae Burtt Davy ex Moffett, accepted as Searsia rigida (Mill.) F.A.Barkley var. margaretae (Burtt Davy ex Moffett) Moffett, indigenous
 Rhus rimosa Eckl. & Zeyh. accepted as Searsia rimosa (Eckl. & Zeyh.) Moffett, endemic
 Rhus rogersii Schonland, accepted as Searsia rogersii (Schonland) Moffett, indigenous
 Rhus rosmarinifolia Vahl, accepted as Searsia rosmarinifolia (Vahl) F.A.Barkley, endemic
 Rhus rudatisii Engl. accepted as Searsia rudatisii (Engl.) Moffett, endemic
 Rhus scytophylla Eckl. & Zeyh. accepted as Searsia scytophylla (Eckl. & Zeyh.) Moffett, indigenous
 Rhus scytophylla Eckl. & Zeyh. var. dentata Moffett, accepted as Searsia scytophylla (Eckl. & Zeyh.) Moffett var. dentata (Moffett) Moffett, endemic
 Rhus sekhukhuniensis Moffett, accepted as Searsia sekhukhuniensis (Moffett) Moffett, endemic
 Rhus steingroeveri Engl. accepted as Searsia populifolia (E.Mey. ex Sond.) Moffett 
 Rhus stenophylla Eckl. & Zeyh. accepted as Searsia stenophylla (Eckl. & Zeyh.) Moffett, endemic
 Rhus succedanea L. accepted as Toxicodendron succedaneum (L.) Kuntze, not indigenous, naturalised
 Rhus tomentosa L. accepted as Searsia tomentosa (L.) F.A.Barkley, present
 Rhus transvaalensis Engl. accepted as Searsia transvaalensis (Engl.) Moffett, present
 Rhus tridactyla Burch. accepted as Searsia tridactyla (Burch.) Moffett, endemic
 Rhus tumulicola S.Moore var. meeuseana (R.Fern. & A.Fern.) Moffett, indigenous
 Rhus tumulicola S.Moore var. meeuseana (R.Fern. & A.Fern.) Moffett forma pumila, accepted as Searsia tumulicola (S.Moore) Moffett var. meeuseana (R.Fern. & A.Fern.) Moffett forma pumila, endemic
 Rhus tumulicola S.Moore var. tumulicola, accepted as Searsia tumulicola (S.Moore) Moffett var. tumulicola, indigenous
 Rhus undulata Jacq. accepted as Searsia undulata (Jacq.) T.S.Yi, A.J.Mill. & J.Wen, indigenous
 Rhus villosissima Engl. accepted as Searsia discolor (E.Mey. ex Sond.) Moffett, present
 Rhus volkii Suess. accepted as Searsia volkii (Suess.) Moffett 
 Rhus wilmsii Diels, accepted as Searsia wilmsii (Diels) Moffett, endemic
 Rhus zeyheri Sond. accepted as Searsia zeyheri (Sond.) Moffett, endemic

Schinus
Genus Schinus:
 Schinus molle L. not indigenous, naturalised, invasive
 Schinus terebinthifolius Raddi, not indigenous, cultivated, naturalised, invasive
 Schinus terebinthifolius Raddi var. acutifolius Engl. accepted as Schinus terebinthifolius Raddi, not indigenous, naturalised

Sclerocarya
Genus Sclerocarya:
 Sclerocarya birrea (A.Rich.) Hochst. indigenous
 Sclerocarya birrea (A.Rich.) Hochst. subsp. caffra (Sond.) Kokwaro, indigenous

Searsia
Genus Searsia:
 Searsia acocksii (Moffett) Moffett, endemic
 Searsia albomarginata (Sond.) Moffett, endemic
 Searsia angustifolia (L.) F.A.Barkley, endemic
 Searsia batophylla (Codd) Moffett, endemic
 Searsia bolusii (Sond. ex Engl.) Moffett, indigenous
 Searsia burchellii (Sond. ex Engl.) Moffett, indigenous
 Searsia carnosula (Schonland) Moffett, endemic
 Searsia chirindensis (Baker f.) Moffett, indigenous
 Searsia ciliata (Licht. ex Schult.) A.J.Mill. indigenous
 Searsia crenata (Thunb.) Moffett, endemic
 Searsia cuneifolia (L.f.) F.A.Barkley, endemic
 Searsia dentata (Thunb.) F.A.Barkley, indigenous
 Searsia discolor (E.Mey. ex Sond.) Moffett, indigenous
 Searsia dissecta (Thunb.) Moffett, endemic
 Searsia divaricata (Eckl. & Zeyh.) Moffett, indigenous
 Searsia dracomontana (Moffett) Moffett, endemic
 Searsia dregeana (Sond.) Moffett, indigenous
 Searsia engleri (Britten) Moffett, endemic
 Searsia erosa (Thunb.) Moffett, indigenous
 Searsia fastigata (Eckl. & Zeyh.) Moffett, endemic
 Searsia gerrardii (Harv. ex Engl.) Moffett, indigenous
 Searsia glauca (Thunb.) Moffett, endemic
 Searsia gracillima (Engl.) Moffett, endemic
 Searsia gracillima (Engl.) Moffett var. glaberrima (Schonland) Moffett, endemic
 Searsia gracillima (Engl.) Moffett var. gracillima, endemic
 Searsia grandidens (Harv. ex Engl.) Moffett, indigenous
 Searsia gueinzii (Sond.) F.A.Barkley, indigenous
 Searsia harveyi (Moffett) Moffett, indigenous
 Searsia horrida (Eckl. & Zeyh.) Moffett, endemic
 Searsia incisa (L.f.) F.A.Barkley, endemic
 Searsia incisa (L.f.) F.A.Barkley var. effusa (C.Presl) Moffett, endemic
 Searsia incisa (L.f.) F.A.Barkley var. incisa, endemic
 Searsia keetii (Schonland) Moffett, endemic
 Searsia krebsiana (C.Presl ex Engl.) Moffett, indigenous
 Searsia kwazuluana (Moffett) Moffett, endemic
 Searsia laevigata (L.) F.A.Barkley, endemic
 Searsia laevigata (L.) F.A.Barkley var. laevigata forma congoana, endemic
 Searsia laevigata (L.) F.A.Barkley var. laevigata forma laevigata, endemic
 Searsia laevigata (L.) F.A.Barkley var. villosa (L.f.) Moffett, endemic
 Searsia lancea (L.f.) F.A.Barkley, indigenous
 Searsia leptodictya (Diels) T.S.Yi, A.J.Mill. & J.Wen, indigenous
 Searsia leptodictya (Diels) T.S.Yi, A.J.Mill. & J.Wen forma leptodictya, indigenous
 Searsia longispina (Eckl. & Zeyh.) Moffett, endemic
 Searsia lucida (L.) F.A.Barkley, indigenous
 Searsia lucida (L.) F.A.Barkley forma elliptica (Sond.) Moffett, endemic
 Searsia lucida (L.) F.A.Barkley forma lucida, indigenous
 Searsia lucida (L.) F.A.Barkley forma scoparia (Eckl. & Zeyh.) Moffett, endemic
 Searsia magalismontana (Sond.) Moffett, indigenous
 Searsia magalismontana (Sond.) Moffett subsp. coddii (R.Fern. & A.Fern.) Moffett, endemic
 Searsia magalismontana (Sond.) Moffett subsp. magalismontana, indigenous
 Searsia magalismontana (Sond.) Moffett subsp. trifoliolata (Baker f.) Moffett, indigenous
 Searsia maricoana (Moffett) Moffett, endemic
 Searsia montana (Diels) Moffett, indigenous
 Searsia natalensis (Bernh. ex C.Krauss) F.A.Barkley, indigenous
 Searsia nebulosa (Schonland) Moffett, indigenous
 Searsia nebulosa (Schonland) Moffett forma nebulosa, indigenous
 Searsia nebulosa (Schonland) Moffett forma pubescens (Moffett) Moffett, endemic
 Searsia pallens (Eckl. & Zeyh.) Moffett, indigenous
 Searsia pendulina (Jacq.) Moffett, indigenous
 Searsia pentheri (Zahlbr.) Moffett, indigenous
 Searsia pondoensis (Schonland) Moffett, endemic
 Searsia populifolia (E.Mey. ex Sond.) Moffett, indigenous
 Searsia pterota (C.Presl) Moffett, endemic
 Searsia pygmaea (Moffett) Moffett, endemic
 Searsia pyroides (Burch.) Moffett, indigenous
 Searsia pyroides (Burch.) Moffett var. gracilis (Engl.) Moffett, indigenous
 Searsia pyroides (Burch.) Moffett var. integrifolia (Engl.) Moffett, indigenous
 Searsia pyroides (Burch.) Moffett var. pyroides, indigenous
 Searsia refracta (Eckl. & Zeyh.) Moffett, endemic
 Searsia rehmanniana (Engl.) Moffett, indigenous
 Searsia rehmanniana (Engl.) Moffett var. glabrata (Sond.) Moffett, indigenous
 Searsia rehmanniana (Engl.) Moffett var. rehmanniana, indigenous
 Searsia rigida (Mill.) F.A.Barkley, indigenous
 Searsia rigida (Mill.) F.A.Barkley var. dentata (Engl.) Moffett, indigenous
 Searsia rigida (Mill.) F.A.Barkley var. margaretae (Burtt Davy ex Moffett) Moffett, indigenous
 Searsia rigida (Mill.) F.A.Barkley var. rigida, indigenous
 Searsia rimosa (Eckl. & Zeyh.) Moffett, endemic
 Searsia rogersii (Schonland) Moffett, indigenous
 Searsia rosmarinifolia (Vahl) F.A.Barkley, endemic
 Searsia rudatisii (Engl.) Moffett, endemic
 Searsia scytophylla (Eckl. & Zeyh.) Moffett, endemic
 Searsia scytophylla (Eckl. & Zeyh.) Moffett var. dentata (Moffett) Moffett, endemic
 Searsia scytophylla (Eckl. & Zeyh.) Moffett var. scytophylla, endemic
 Searsia sekhukhuniensis (Moffett) Moffett, endemic
 Searsia stenophylla (Eckl. & Zeyh.) Moffett, endemic
 Searsia tenuinervis (Engl.) Moffett, indigenous
 Searsia tomentosa (L.) F.A.Barkley, indigenous
 Searsia transvaalensis (Engl.) Moffett, indigenous
 Searsia tridactyla (Burch.) Moffett, endemic
 Searsia tumulicola (S.Moore) Moffett, indigenous
 Searsia tumulicola (S.Moore) Moffett var. meeuseana (R.Fern. & A.Fern.) Moffett forma meeuseana, indigenous
 Searsia tumulicola (S.Moore) Moffett var. meeuseana (R.Fern. & A.Fern.) Moffett forma pumila, endemic
 Searsia tumulicola (S.Moore) Moffett var. tumulicola, indigenous
 Searsia undulata (Jacq.) T.S.Yi, A.J.Mill. & J.Wen, indigenous
 Searsia wilmsii (Diels) Moffett, endemic
 Searsia zeyheri (Sond.) Moffett, endemic

Smodingium
Genus Smodingium:
 Smodingium argutum E.Mey. ex Sond. endemic

Toxicodendron
Genus Toxicodendron:
 Toxicodendron succedaneum (L.) Kuntze, not indigenous, cultivated, naturalised, invasive

Burseraceae
 Family: Burseraceae,

Commiphora
Genus Commiphora:
 Commiphora africana (A.Rich.) Engl. indigenous
 Commiphora africana (A.Rich.) Engl. var. africana, indigenous
 Commiphora angolensis Engl. indigenous
 Commiphora capensis (Sond.) Engl. indigenous
 Commiphora cervifolia J.J.A.van der Walt, indigenous
 Commiphora edulis (Klotzsch) Engl. indigenous
 Commiphora edulis (Klotzsch) Engl. subsp. edulis, indigenous
 Commiphora gariepensis Swanepoel, indigenous
 Commiphora glandulosa Schinz, indigenous
 Commiphora gracilifrondosa Dinter ex J.J.A.van der Walt, indigenous
 Commiphora harveyi (Engl.) Engl. indigenous
 Commiphora marlothii Engl. indigenous
 Commiphora merkeri Engl. accepted as Commiphora viminea Burtt Davy, present
 Commiphora mollis (Oliv.) Engl. indigenous
 Commiphora namaensis Schinz, indigenous
 Commiphora neglecta I.Verd. indigenous
 Commiphora pyracanthoides Engl. indigenous
 Commiphora schimperi (O.Berg) Engl. indigenous
 Commiphora tenuipetiolata Engl. indigenous
 Commiphora viminea Burtt Davy, indigenous
 Commiphora woodii Engl. indigenous
 Commiphora zanzibarica (Baill.) Engl. indigenous

Kirkiaceae
 Family: Kirkiaceae,

Kirkia
Genus Kirkia:
 Kirkia acuminata Oliv. indigenous
 Kirkia wilmsii Engl. indigenous

Meliaceae
 Family: Meliaceae,

Cedrela
Genus Cedrela:
 Cedrela odorata L. not indigenous, naturalised

Chukrasia
Genus Chukrasia:
 Chukrasia tabularis A.Juss. not indigenous, cultivated, naturalised

Ekebergia
Genus Ekebergia:
 Ekebergia capensis Sparrm. indigenous
 Ekebergia pterophylla (C.DC.) Hofmeyr, indigenous

Entandrophragma
Genus Entandrophragma:
 Entandrophragma caudatum (Sprague) Sprague, indigenous

Khaya
Genus Khaya:
 Khaya anthotheca (Welw.) C.DC. not indigenous, naturalised

Melia
Genus Melia:
 Melia azedarach L. not indigenous, naturalised, invasive

Nymania
Genus Nymania:
 Nymania capensis (Thunb.) Lindb. indigenous

Pseudobersama
Genus Pseudobersama:
 Pseudobersama mossambicensis (Sim) Verdc. indigenous

Toona
Genus Toona:
 Toona ciliata M.Roem. not indigenous, naturalised, invasive

Trichilia
Genus Trichilia:
 Trichilia dregeana Sond. indigenous
 Trichilia emetica Vahl, indigenous
 Trichilia emetica Vahl subsp. emetica, indigenous

Turraea
Genus Turraea:
 Turraea floribunda Hochst. indigenous
 Turraea nilotica Kotschy & Peyr. indigenous
 Turraea obtusifolia Hochst. indigenous
 Turraea pulchella (Harms) T.D.Penn. endemic
 Turraea streyi F.White & Styles, endemic

Xylocarpus
Genus Xylocarpus:
 Xylocarpus granatum J.Konig, indigenous

Peganaceae
 Family: Peganaceae,

Peganum
Genus Peganum:
 Peganum harmala L. not indigenous, naturalised

Rutaceae
 Family: Rutaceae,

Acmadenia
Genus Acmadenia:
 Acmadenia alternifolia Cham. endemic
 Acmadenia argillophila I.Williams, endemic
 Acmadenia baileyensis I.Williams, endemic
 Acmadenia bodkinii (Schltr.) Strid, endemic
 Acmadenia burchellii Dummer, endemic
 Acmadenia candida I.Williams, endemic
 Acmadenia densifolia Sond. endemic
 Acmadenia faucitincta I.Williams, endemic
 Acmadenia flaccida Eckl. & Zeyh. endemic
 Acmadenia fruticosa I.Williams, endemic
 Acmadenia gracilis Dummer, endemic
 Acmadenia heterophylla P.E.Glover, endemic
 Acmadenia kiwanensis I.Williams, endemic
 Acmadenia latifolia I.Williams, endemic
 Acmadenia laxa I.Williams, endemic
 Acmadenia macradenia (Sond.) Dummer, endemic
 Acmadenia macropetala (P.E.Glover) Compton, endemic
 Acmadenia maculata I.Williams, endemic
 Acmadenia matroosbergensis E.Phillips, endemic
 Acmadenia mundiana Eckl. & Zeyh. endemic
 Acmadenia nivea I.Williams, endemic
 Acmadenia nivenii Sond. endemic
 Acmadenia obtusata (Thunb.) Bartl. & H.L.Wendl. endemic
 Acmadenia obtusata (Thunb.) Bartl. & H.L.Wendl. var. macropetala Glover, accepted as Acmadenia macropetala (P.E.Glover) Compton, present
 Acmadenia patentifolia I.Williams, endemic
 Acmadenia rourkeana I.Williams, endemic
 Acmadenia rupicola I.Williams, endemic
 Acmadenia sheilae I.Williams, endemic
 Acmadenia tenax I.Williams, endemic
 Acmadenia teretifolia (Link) E.Phillips, endemic
 Acmadenia tetracarpellata I.Williams, endemic
 Acmadenia tetragona (L.f.) Bartl. & H.L.Wendl. endemic
 Acmadenia trigona (Eckl. & Zeyh.) Druce, endemic
 Acmadenia wittebergensis (Compton) I.Williams, endemic

Adenandra
Genus Adenandra:
 Adenandra acuta Schltr. endemic
 Adenandra brachyphylla Schltdl. endemic
 Adenandra coriacea Licht. ex Roem. & Schult. endemic
 Adenandra dahlgrenii Strid, endemic
 Adenandra fragrans (Sims) Roem. & Schult. endemic
 Adenandra gracilis Eckl. & Zeyh. endemic
 Adenandra gummifera Strid, endemic
 Adenandra lasiantha Sond. endemic
 Adenandra marginata (L.f.) Roem. & Schult. endemic
 Adenandra marginata (L.f.) Roem. & Schult. subsp. humilis (Eckl. & Zeyh.) Strid, accepted as Adenandra humilis Eckl. & Zeyh. endemic
 Adenandra marginata (L.f.) Roem. & Schult. subsp. marginata, endemic
 Adenandra marginata (L.f.) Roem. & Schult. subsp. mucronata Strid, endemic
 Adenandra marginata (L.f.) Roem. & Schult. subsp. serpyllacea (Bartl.) Strid, endemic
 Adenandra multiflora Strid, endemic
 Adenandra mundiifolia Eckl. & Zeyh. endemic
 Adenandra obtusata Sond. endemic
 Adenandra odoratissima Strid, endemic
 Adenandra odoratissima Strid subsp. odoratissima, endemic
 Adenandra odoratissima Strid subsp. tenuis Strid, endemic
 Adenandra rotundifolia Eckl. & Zeyh. endemic
 Adenandra schlechteri Dummer, endemic
 Adenandra uniflora (L.) Willd. endemic
 Adenandra villosa (P.J.Bergius) Licht. ex Roem. & Schult. endemic
 Adenandra villosa (P.J.Bergius) Licht. ex Roem. & Schult. subsp. apiculata Strid, endemic
 Adenandra villosa (P.J.Bergius) Licht. ex Roem. & Schult. subsp. biseriata (E.Mey. ex Bartl. & H.L.W, endemic
 Adenandra villosa (P.J.Bergius) Licht. ex Roem. & Schult. subsp. imbricata Strid, endemic
 Adenandra villosa (P.J.Bergius) Licht. ex Roem. & Schult. subsp. orbicularis Strid, endemic
 Adenandra villosa (P.J.Bergius) Licht. ex Roem. & Schult. subsp. pedicellata Strid, endemic
 Adenandra villosa (P.J.Bergius) Licht. ex Roem. & Schult. subsp. robusta Strid, endemic
 Adenandra villosa (P.J.Bergius) Licht. ex Roem. & Schult. subsp. sonderi (Dummer) Strid, endemic
 Adenandra villosa (P.J.Bergius) Licht. ex Roem. & Schult. subsp. umbellata (J.C.Wendl.) Strid, endemic
 Adenandra villosa (P.J.Bergius) Licht. ex Roem. & Schult. subsp. villosa, endemic
 Adenandra viscidia Eckl. & Zeyh. endemic

Agathosma
Genus Agathosma:
 Agathosma abrupta Pillans, endemic
 Agathosma acocksii Pillans, endemic
 Agathosma acutissima Dummer, endemic
 Agathosma adenandriflora Schltr. endemic
 Agathosma adnata Pillans, endemic
 Agathosma aemula Schltr. endemic
 Agathosma affinis Sond. endemic
 Agathosma alaris Cham. endemic
 Agathosma alligans I.Williams, endemic
 Agathosma alpina Schltr. endemic
 Agathosma alticola Schltr. ex Dummer, endemic
 Agathosma anomala E.Mey. ex Sond. endemic
 Agathosma apiculata G.Mey. endemic
 Agathosma asperifolia Eckl. & Zeyh. endemic
 Agathosma barnesiae Compton, endemic
 Agathosma bathii (Dummer) Pillans, endemic
 Agathosma betulina (P.J.Bergius) Pillans, endemic
 Agathosma bicolor Dummer, endemic
 Agathosma bicornuta R.A.Dyer, endemic
 Agathosma bifida (Jacq.) Bartl. & H.L.Wendl. endemic
 Agathosma bisulca (Thunb.) Bartl. & H.L.Wendl. endemic
 Agathosma blaerioides Cham. endemic
 Agathosma bodkinii Dummer, endemic
 Agathosma capensis (L.) Dummer, endemic
 Agathosma capitata Sond. endemic
 Agathosma cedrimontana Dummer, endemic
 Agathosma cephalodes E.Mey. ex Sond. endemic
 Agathosma cerefolium (Vent.) Bartl. & H.L.Wendl. endemic
 Agathosma ciliaris (L.) Druce, endemic
 Agathosma ciliata (L.) Link, endemic
 Agathosma clavisepala R.A.Dyer, endemic
 Agathosma collina Eckl. & Zeyh. endemic
 Agathosma concava Pillans, endemic
 Agathosma conferta Pillans, endemic
 Agathosma cordifolia Pillans, endemic
 Agathosma corymbosa (Montin) G.Don, endemic
 Agathosma craspedota Sond. endemic
 Agathosma crassifolia Sond. endemic
 Agathosma crenulata (L.) Pillans, endemic
 Agathosma decurrens Pillans, endemic
 Agathosma dentata Pillans, endemic
 Agathosma dielsiana Schltr. ex Dummer, endemic
 Agathosma distans Pillans, endemic
 Agathosma divaricata Pillans, endemic
 Agathosma dregeana Sond. endemic
 Agathosma elata Sond. endemic
 Agathosma elegans Cham. endemic
 Agathosma eriantha (Steud.) Steud. endemic
 Agathosma esterhuyseniae Pillans, endemic
 Agathosma florida Sond. endemic
 Agathosma florulenta Sond. endemic
 Agathosma foetidissima (Bartl. & H.L.Wendl.) Steud. endemic
 Agathosma foleyana Dummer, endemic
 Agathosma fraudulenta Sond. endemic
 Agathosma geniculata Pillans, endemic
 Agathosma giftbergensis E.Phillips, endemic
 Agathosma glabrata Bartl. & H.L.Wendl. endemic
 Agathosma glandulosa (Thunb.) Sond. endemic
 Agathosma gnidiiflora Dummer, endemic
 Agathosma gonaquensis Eckl. & Zeyh. endemic
 Agathosma hirsuta Pillans, endemic
 Agathosma hirta (Lam.) Bartl. & H.L.Wendl. endemic
 Agathosma hispida (Thunb.) Bartl. & H.L.Wendl. endemic
 Agathosma hookeri Sond. endemic
 Agathosma humilis Sond. endemic
 Agathosma imbricata (L.) Willd. endemic
 Agathosma insignis (Compton) Pillans, endemic
 Agathosma involucrata Eckl. & Zeyh. endemic
 Agathosma joubertiana Schltdl. endemic
 Agathosma juniperifolia Bartl. endemic
 Agathosma kougaense Pillans, endemic
 Agathosma krakadouwensis Dummer, endemic
 Agathosma lanceolata (L.) Engl. endemic
 Agathosma lancifolia Eckl. & Zeyh. endemic
 Agathosma latipetala Sond. endemic
 Agathosma leptospermoides Sond. endemic
 Agathosma linifolia (Roem. & Schult.) Licht. ex Bartl. & H.L.Wendl. endemic
 Agathosma longicornu Pillans, endemic
 Agathosma marifolia Eckl. & Zeyh. endemic
 Agathosma marlothii Dummer, endemic
 Agathosma martiana Sond. endemic
 Agathosma microcalyx Dummer, endemic
 Agathosma microcarpa (Sond.) Pillans, endemic
 Agathosma minuta Schltdl. endemic
 Agathosma mirabilis Pillans, endemic
 Agathosma mucronulata Sond. endemic
 Agathosma muirii E.Phillips, endemic
 Agathosma mundtii Cham. & Schltdl. endemic
 Agathosma namaquensis Pillans, endemic
 Agathosma odoratissima (Montin) Pillans, endemic
 Agathosma orbicularis (Thunb.) Bartl. & H.L.Wendl. endemic
 Agathosma ovalifolia Pillans, endemic
 Agathosma ovata (Thunb.) Pillans, indigenous
 Agathosma pallens Pillans, endemic
 Agathosma pattisoniae Dummer, endemic
 Agathosma peglerae Dummer, endemic
 Agathosma pentachotoma E.Mey. ex Sond. endemic
 Agathosma phillipsii Dummer, endemic
 Agathosma pilifera Schltdl. endemic
 Agathosma planifolia Sond. endemic
 Agathosma propinqua Sond. endemic
 Agathosma puberula (Steud.) Fourc. endemic
 Agathosma pubigera Sond. endemic
 Agathosma pulchella (L.) Link, endemic
 Agathosma pungens (E.Mey. ex Sond.) Pillans, endemic
 Agathosma purpurea Pillans, endemic
 Agathosma recurvifolia Sond. endemic
 Agathosma rehmanniana Dummer, endemic
 Agathosma riversdalensis Dummer, endemic
 Agathosma robusta Eckl. & Zeyh. endemic
 Agathosma roodebergensis Compton, endemic
 Agathosma rosmarinifolia (Bartl.) I.Williams, endemic
 Agathosma rubricaulis Dummer, endemic
 Agathosma rudolphii I.Williams, endemic
 Agathosma sabulosa Sond. endemic
 Agathosma salina Eckl. & Zeyh. endemic
 Agathosma scaberula Dummer, endemic
 Agathosma sedifolia Schltdl. endemic
 Agathosma serpyllacea Licht. ex Roem. & Schult. endemic
 Agathosma serratifolia (Curtis) Spreeth, endemic
 Agathosma sladeniana R.Glover, endemic
 Agathosma spinescens Dummer, endemic
 Agathosma spinosa Sond. endemic
 Agathosma squamosa (Roem. & Schult.) Bartl. & H.L.Wendl. endemic
 Agathosma stenopetala (Steud.) Steud. endemic
 Agathosma stenosepala Pillans, endemic
 Agathosma stilbeoides Dummer, endemic
 Agathosma stipitata Pillans, endemic
 Agathosma stokoei Pillans, endemic
 Agathosma subteretifolia Pillans, endemic
 Agathosma tabularis Sond. endemic
 Agathosma thymifolia Schltdl. endemic
 Agathosma trichocarpa Holmes, endemic
 Agathosma tulbaghensis Dummer, endemic
 Agathosma umbonata Pillans, endemic
 Agathosma unicarpellata (Fourc.) Pillans, endemic
 Agathosma venusta (Eckl. & Zeyh.) Pillans, endemic
 Agathosma virgata (Lam.) Bartl. & H.L.Wendl. endemic
 Agathosma zwartbergense Pillans, endemic

Calodendrum
Genus Calodendrum:
 Calodendrum capense (L.f.) Thunb. indigenous

Clausena
Genus Clausena:
 Clausena anisata (Willd.) Hook.f. ex Benth. indigenous
 Clausena anisata (Willd.) Hook.f. ex Benth. subsp. abyssinica (Engl.) Cufod. accepted as Clausena anisata (Willd.) Hook.f. ex Benth. var. anisata 
 Clausena anisata (Willd.) Hook.f. ex Benth. var. anisata, indigenous

Coleonema
Genus Coleonema:
 Coleonema album (Thunb.) Bartl. & H.L.Wendl. endemic
 Coleonema aspalathoides Juss. ex G.Don, endemic
 Coleonema calycinum (Steud.) I.Williams, endemic
 Coleonema juniperinum Sond. endemic
 Coleonema nubigenum Esterh. endemic
 Coleonema pulchellum I.Williams, endemic
 Coleonema pulchrum Hook. endemic
 Coleonema virgatum (Schltdl.) Eckl. & Zeyh. endemic

Diosma
Genus Diosma:
 Diosma acmaeophylla Eckl. & Zeyh. endemic
 Diosma apetala (Dummer) I.Williams, endemic
 Diosma arenicola I.Williams, endemic
 Diosma aristata I.Williams, endemic
 Diosma aspalathoides Lam. endemic
 Diosma awilana I.Williams, endemic
 Diosma capitata L. accepted as Audouinia capitata (L.) Brongn. indigenous
 Diosma cuspidata Thunb. accepted as Linconia cuspidata (Thunb.) Sw. indigenous
 Diosma demissa I.Williams, endemic
 Diosma deusta Thunb. accepted as Linconia cuspidata (Thunb.) Sw. indigenous
 Diosma dichotoma P.J.Bergius, endemic
 Diosma echinulata I.Williams, endemic
 Diosma fallax I.Williams, endemic
 Diosma guthriei P.E.Glover, endemic
 Diosma haelkraalensis I.Williams, endemic
 Diosma hirsuta L. endemic
 Diosma meyeriana Spreng. endemic
 Diosma oppositifolia L. endemic
 Diosma parvula I.Williams, endemic
 Diosma passerinoides Steud. endemic
 Diosma pedicellata I.Williams, endemic
 Diosma pilosa I.Williams, endemic
 Diosma prama I.Williams, endemic
 Diosma ramosissima Bartl. & H.L.Wendl. endemic
 Diosma recurva Cham. endemic
 Diosma rourkei I.Williams, endemic
 Diosma sabulosa I.Williams, endemic
 Diosma strumosa I.Williams, endemic
 Diosma subulata J.C.Wendl. endemic
 Diosma tenella I.Williams, endemic
 Diosma thyrsophora Eckl. & Zeyh. endemic
 Diosma ustulata Thunb. accepted as Thamnea unstulata (Thunb.) A.V.Hall, endemic

Empleurum
Genus Empleurum:
 Empleurum fragrans P.E.Glover, endemic
 Empleurum unicapsulare (L.f.) Skeels, endemic

Euchaetis
Genus Euchaetis:
 Euchaetis albertiniana I.Williams, endemic
 Euchaetis avisylvana I.Williams, endemic
 Euchaetis burchellii Dummer, endemic
 Euchaetis cristagalli I.Williams, endemic
 Euchaetis diosmoides (Schltr.) I.Williams, endemic
 Euchaetis elata Eckl. & Zeyh. endemic
 Euchaetis elsieae I.Williams, endemic
 Euchaetis ericoides Dummer, endemic
 Euchaetis esterhuyseniae I.Williams, endemic
 Euchaetis flexilis Eckl. & Zeyh. endemic
 Euchaetis glabra I.Williams, endemic
 Euchaetis glomerata Bartl. & H.L.Wendl. endemic
 Euchaetis intonsa I.Williams, endemic
 Euchaetis laevigata Turcz. endemic
 Euchaetis linearis Sond. endemic
 Euchaetis longibracteata Schltr. endemic
 Euchaetis longicornis I.Williams, endemic
 Euchaetis meridionalis I.Williams, endemic
 Euchaetis pungens (Bartl. & H.L.Wendl.) I.Williams, endemic
 Euchaetis scabricosta I.Williams, endemic
 Euchaetis schlechteri Schinz, endemic
 Euchaetis tricarpellata I.Williams, endemic
 Euchaetis vallis-simiae I.Williams, endemic

Macrostylis
Genus Macrostylis:
 Macrostylis barbigera (L.f.) Bartl. & H.L.Wendl. endemic
 Macrostylis cassiopoides (Turcz.) I.Williams, indigenous
 Macrostylis cassiopoides (Turcz.) I.Williams subsp. cassiopoides, endemic
 Macrostylis cassiopoides (Turcz.) I.Williams subsp. dregeana (Sond.) I.Williams, endemic
 Macrostylis cauliflora I.Williams, endemic
 Macrostylis crassifolia Sond. endemic
 Macrostylis decipiens E.Mey. ex Sond. endemic
 Macrostylis hirta E.Mey. ex Sond. endemic
 Macrostylis ramulosa I.Williams, endemic
 Macrostylis squarrosa Bartl. & H.L.Wendl. endemic
 Macrostylis tenuis E.Mey. ex Sond. endemic
 Macrostylis villosa (Thunb.) Sond. indigenous
 Macrostylis villosa (Thunb.) Sond. subsp. minor I.Williams, endemic
 Macrostylis villosa (Thunb.) Sond. subsp. villosa, endemic

Murraya
Genus Murraya:
 Murraya paniculata (L.) Jack, not indigenous, cultivated, naturalised, invasive
 Murraya paniculata (L.) Jack var. paniculata, not indigenous, cultivated, naturalised, invasive

Oricia
Genus Oricia – synonym of Vepris
 Oricia bachmannii (Engl.) I.Verd. accepted as Vepris bachmannii (Engl.) Mziray, indigenous
 Oricia swynnertonii (Baker f.) I.Verd. accepted as Vepris bachmannii (Engl.) Mziray, indigenous
 Oricia transvaalensis I.Verd. accepted as Vepris bachmannii (Engl.) Mziray, present

Phyllosma
Genus Phyllosma:
 Phyllosma barosmoides (Dummer) I.Williams, endemic
 Phyllosma capensis Bolus, endemic

Ptaeroxylon
Genus Ptaeroxylon:
 Ptaeroxylon obliquum (Thunb.) Radlk. indigenous

Ruta
Genus Ruta:
 Ruta graveolens L. not indigenous, naturalised

Sheilanthera
Genus Sheilanthera:
 Sheilanthera pubens I.Williams, endemic

Teclea
Genus Teclea – synonym of Vepris
 Teclea bachmannii Engl. accepted as Vepris bachmannii (Engl.) Mziray, indigenous
 Teclea gerrardii I.Verd. accepted as Vepris trichocarpa (Engl.) Mziray, indigenous
 Teclea natalensis (Sond.) Engl. accepted as Vepris natalensis (Sond.) Mziray, indigenous
 Teclea pilosa (Engl.) I.Verd. accepted as Vepris carringtoniana MendonÃ§a, indigenous
 Teclea swynnertonii Baker f. accepted as Vepris bachmannii (Engl.) Mziray, indigenous

Thamnosma
Genus Thamnosma:
 Thamnosma africana Engl. indigenous

Toddalia
Genus Toddalia:
 Toddalia asiatica (L.) Lam. indigenous
 Toddalia natalensis Sond. accepted as Vepris natalensis (Sond.) Mziray, indigenous

Toddaliopsis
Genus Toddaliopsis – synonym of Vepris
 Toddaliopsis bremekampii I.Verd. accepted as Vepris bremekampii (I.Verd.) Mziray, indigenous

Vepris
Genus Vepris:
 Vepris bachmannii (Engl.) Mziray, indigenous
 Vepris bremekampii (I.Verd.) Mziray, indigenous
 Vepris carringtoniana MendonÃ§a, indigenous
 Vepris lanceolata (Lam.) G.Don, indigenous
 Vepris natalensis (Sond.) Mziray, indigenous
 Vepris reflexa I.Verd. indigenous
 Vepris trichocarpa (Engl.) Mziray, indigenous

Zanthoxylum
Genus Zanthoxylum:
 Zanthoxylum capense (Thunb.) Harv. indigenous
 Zanthoxylum davyi (I.Verd.) P.G.Waterman, indigenous
 Zanthoxylum humile (E.A.Bruce) P.G.Waterman, indigenous
 Zanthoxylum leprieurii Guill. & Perr. indigenous
 Zanthoxylum thorncroftii (I.Verd.) P.G.Waterman, endemic

Sapindaceae
 Family: Sapindaceae,

Acer
Genus Acer:
 Acer buergerianum Miq. not indigenous, naturalised, invasive
 Acer negundo L. not indigenous, naturalised, invasive

Allophylus
Genus Allophylus:
 Allophylus africanus P.Beauv. indigenous
 Allophylus africanus P.Beauv. var. africanus, indigenous
 Allophylus chaunostachys Gilg, indigenous
 Allophylus decipiens (Sond.) Radlk. indigenous
 Allophylus dregeanus (Sond.) De Winter, endemic
 Allophylus melanocarpus (Sond.) Radlk. accepted as Allophylus africanus P.Beauv. var. africanus, present
 Allophylus natalensis (Sond.) De Winter, indigenous
 Allophylus rubifolius (Hochst. ex A.Rich.) Engl. indigenous
 Allophylus rubifolius (Hochst. ex A.Rich.) Engl. var. rubifolius, indigenous
 Allophylus transvaalensis Burtt Davy, accepted as Allophylus africanus P.Beauv. var. africanus, present

Atalaya
Genus Atalaya:
 Atalaya alata (Sim) H.M.L.Forbes, indigenous
 Atalaya capensis R.A.Dyer, endemic
 Atalaya natalensis R.A.Dyer, endemic

Blighia
Genus Blighia:
 Blighia unijugata Baker, indigenous
 Blighia zambesiaca Baker, accepted as Blighia unijugata Baker, present

Cardiospermum
Genus Cardiospermum:
 Cardiospermum corindum L. indigenous
 Cardiospermum grandiflorum Sw. not indigenous, naturalised, invasive
 Cardiospermum grandiflorum Sw. forma hirsutum (Willd.) Radlk. accepted as Cardiospermum grandiflorum Sw. present
 Cardiospermum halicacabum L. not indigenous, naturalised, invasive
 Cardiospermum halicacabum L. var. halicacabum, indigenous
 Cardiospermum halicacabum L. var. microcarpum (Kunth) Blume, indigenous

Deinbollia
Genus Deinbollia:
 Deinbollia oblongifolia (E.Mey. ex Arn.) Radlk. indigenous
 Deinbollia xanthocarpa (Klotzsch) Radlk. indigenous

Dodonaea
Genus Dodonaea:
 Dodonaea viscosa Jacq. indigenous
 Dodonaea viscosa subsp. angustifolia (L.f.) J.G.West present
 Dodonaea viscosa Jacq. var. angustifolia (L.f.) Benth. indigenous
 Dodonaea viscosa Jacq. var. viscosa, indigenous

Erythrophysa
Genus Erythrophysa:
 Erythrophysa alata (Eckl. & Zeyh.) Hutch. indigenous
 Erythrophysa transvaalensis I.Verd. indigenous

Haplocoelum
Genus Haplocoelum:
 Haplocoelum foliolosum (Hiern) Bullock, indigenous
 Haplocoelum foliolosum (Hiern) Bullock subsp. mombasense (Bullock) Verdc. indigenous
 Haplocoelum gallaense (Engl.) Radlk. accepted as Haplocoelum foliolosum (Hiern) Bullock subsp. mombasense (Bullock) Verdc. present

Hippobromus
Genus Hippobromus:
 Hippobromus pauciflorus (L.f.) Radlk. indigenous

Pancovia
Genus Pancovia:
 Pancovia golungensis (Hiern) Exell & MendonÃ§a, indigenous

Pappea
Genus Pappea:
 Pappea capensis Eckl. & Zeyh. indigenous

Paullinia
Genus Paullinia:
 Paullinia asiatica L. accepted as Toddalia asiatica (L.) Lam.

Smelophyllum
Genus Smelophyllum:
 Smelophyllum capense (Sond.) Radlk. indigenous

Stadmannia
Genus Stadmannia:
 Stadmannia oppositifolia Lam. indigenous
 Stadmannia oppositifolia Lam. subsp. rhodesica Exell, indigenous

Simaroubaceae
 Family: Simaroubaceae,

Ailanthus
Genus Ailanthus:
 Ailanthus altissima (Mill.) Swingle, not indigenous, naturalised, invasive

References

South African plant biodiversity lists
Sapindales